The Road of Winds (a.k.a. Gobi Notes) is a non-fiction book by Ivan Yefremov about his three years' travel in Mongolia (1946–1949) when he was the head of the Joint Soviet-Mongolian  Paleontology Expedition. 

Most findings described in the book went to Orlov Museum .

External links
  Road of Winds at the Soviet Electronic Library (zip, 400K)

1956 books
1956 in the Soviet Union
Books by Ivan Yefremov
Travel books
Books about Mongolia
Russian non-fiction books